Alain Mbunga Mayo (died 15 July 2012) was a Congolese football striker. He was a squad member at the 1994 Africa Cup of Nations.

References

Year of birth missing
2012 deaths
Democratic Republic of the Congo footballers
Democratic Republic of the Congo international footballers
1994 African Cup of Nations players
AS Dragons players
Atlético Petróleos de Luanda players
Association football forwards
Democratic Republic of the Congo expatriate footballers
Expatriate footballers in Angola
Democratic Republic of the Congo expatriate sportspeople in Angola
21st-century Democratic Republic of the Congo people